Lagadapati Rajagopal (born 1964) is an industrialist and former politician. He was the 15th Lok Sabha MP from the Vijaywada constituency for Indian National Congress. He resigned from Parliament and quit politics after the Telangana Bill was passed in the Lok Sabha. Rajagopal is the principal shareholder of Lanco Infratech.

History
He is the son of L. Ramalakshmamma and L.V. Rama Naidu, a contractor. He went into the family business after attending V R Siddhartha Engineering College, where he was suspended for 1 year.

He married the daughter of politician Parvathaneni Upendra. He started two companies, one in the pig iron business and one in the power industry.

In 2004, he ran for office in the Vijayawada district, the seat previously held by Father-in-law Upendra, and became a member of Parliament. He has been a prominent anti-Telangana voice. His company's headquarters have been moved to Delhi because the Hyderabad offices were deemed  to be targets because of his anti-Telangana positions.

On 13 February 2014, during a discussion of the Telangana Bill, L Rajagopal used pepper spray while on the floor which caused all the members of Parliament  to vacate the building. He stated this was in "self-defence...I used the spray when I saw a colleague from a different party being manhandled".  He was suspended from Parliament by speaker Meira Kumar, along with 4 other MPs. Sharad Yadav, Janata Dal (United)'s President, called the actions "sedition". Protests against his actions included burning Rajagopal in effigy, and a boycott by lawyers in  Warangal district.

He tendered his resignation from Parliament in February 2014.

Committee positions
While in Parliament, he has been on the following Committees:
Committee on Urban Development
Committee on Provision of Computers to Member of Lok Sabha, Offices of Political Parties and Officers of Lok Sabha Secretariat
Committee on External Affairs
Committee on Public Undertakings
Committee on Home Affairs
Consultative Committee for External Affairs
Committee on Public Undertakings

References

External links
MP profile

Living people
1964 births
Businesspeople from Vijayawada
India MPs 2004–2009
India MPs 2009–2014
People from Nellore
Lok Sabha members from Andhra Pradesh
Indian National Congress politicians from Andhra Pradesh
Telugu politicians